You Fail Me is the fifth studio album by American metalcore band Converge, released on September 21, 2004 by Epitaph Records. The band's first release for the label, it was produced by Alan Douches and guitarist Kurt Ballou, with the artwork created by vocalist Jacob Bannon.

You Fail Me was the band's first album to chart commercially, reaching number 171 on the Billboard 200; it also reached number 12 on the Top Heatseekers chart and number 16 on the Independent Albums chart.

Background and recording 
Converge began writing for You Fail Me after they recorded Jane Doe; they wrote on the road during sound checks of shows. Much of the material was worked out in a live setting for some time before the band entered the studio. Bannon stated, "it definitely added a new level of refinement to the album material." Recording for the album took place in March 2004, mainly at GodCity Studio, with additional recording at Magpie Sound Design and Witch Doctor Studio.

Musical style and themes 
When asked about the concept of the album, Bannon said:"After Jane Doe was recorded and released, I thought I was going to feel the emotional burden I was carrying lift from my shoulders. I had all the puzzle pieces there in front of me. Outlets bring closure, or at least that's what I thought. With that, I put myself out on the line looking for an emotional resolve with "Jane..." and it never came. When the album was released I didn't feel any better, nothing was changed. My depression kept collapsing on itself. At that point I stopped hoping and searching and I took a long hard look at my life and at my heart. I did a huge amount of soul searching and found so much failure within myself. That discovery was a massive realization. As I started to see clear again, I also saw the failure in friends and loved ones around me. How we fail each other, and how we fail ourselves. These are songs of failure. And ultimately, surviving self destruction and tragedy we all face in our lives. Musically our only goal was to write an album that moved us and challenged us. We feel we accomplished that."Bannon stated the lyrics are "opinionated" and that there was definitely a "rage" in the writing not apparent in previous albums.

Release and promotion 
You Fail Me was released on September 21, 2004 by Epitaph Records. Converge's first headlining tour in support of the album began in September 2004 with Cave In and Between the Buried and Me. On this tour, Converge sold copies of Bannon's side-project Supermachiner's album Rise of the Great Machine, limited to 50 copies.

On February 14, 2005, a music video was released for the track "Eagles Become Vultures", directed by Zach Merck.

You Fail Me Redux
On June 17, 2016, Converge reissued the album as You Fail Me Redux through Epitaph and Deathwish. The band was "never quite content" with the original mix, and had guitarist Kurt Ballou remix the album and Alan Douches remaster it. The reissue also features updated cover artwork with an inverted color scheme, a black-outlined hand on a white background. The redux had the same track list as the vinyl version of the original album.

In an interview with Noisey, Ballou explained why he felt the album needed to be remixed:"You Fail Me was the last time Converge did a record where I wasn't involved in the entire engineering process. The record that followed You Fail Me, which was No Heroes, was the first time that I both recorded and mixed a Converge record, with the exception of The Poacher Diaries, which was an EP or a split. Upon completing No Heroes and managing to make my bandmates happy with the work I did on that record, I thought that I'd really like to go back and remix You Fail Me. I recorded that one, but Matt Ellard, who did most of the engineering work on Jane Doe, was the one who mixed it. But it was also mixed under less than ideal circumstances. [...] Jane Doe was mixed at Fort Apache on a console that Matt was familiar with, and we had sufficient time to do those mixes. With You Fail Me, he came up and mixed in my studio, which he'd never worked in before, and it was an unfamiliar console. He's a very malleable engineer and can work anywhere, but it probably wasn't his top choice to mix at my place. We also kept having power outages during the mixes. I can't remember the exact details, but I think we booked six days of mixing with him, but he ended up having to do it in about three because he'd come in, work for half an hour, and the power would go out. It was mixed in the summer under brownout conditions, so we'd have electricity in the morning while it was still relatively cool but then as things heated up in the afternoon we'd lose power. So he spent a lot of time lying on the couch waiting for the power to come back on. I still think it turned out great, but there was something about the lack of consistency from song to song and a few other details that made me want to remix it. Sonically, I wanted to make it fit more logically between Jane Doe and No Heroes."

Critical reception 

You Fail Me received positive reviews from critics. AllMusic said that the album "manages to hit all the right emotional highs and lows" and called it "a visceral and bracing blend of metal and old-school, CBGB-worthy gutter hardcore". Joe Pazner of Stylus Magazine said that "Converge has emerged an impeccably pared-down case study in calculated cruelty, resourcefulness and cunning tempered by desperation. More than any record in their expansive catalog, You Fail Me stands as testament to the brutal necessities Converge has created to ensure its survival." Adam Turner-Heffer of Sputnikmusic called the band "as important as Botch and Palehorse in their own genres, and with [You Fail Me], they are here to prove it". Sam Ubl of Pitchfork said, "Not only have Converge retained (even sharpened) their razorblade cut, they're now bolstered by a brawny low-end".

Track listing 
All lyrics written by Jacob Bannon; all music composed by Converge.

Personnel 
Adapted from CD liner notes.

Converge
Jacob Bannon – vocals, lyrics
Kurt Ballou – guitars, vocals, bass guitar, keyboards, percussion
Nate Newton – bass, vocals
Ben Koller – drums, percussion

Additional musicians
 Shawn Moseley – piano on "In Her Shadow"
Production
Kurt Ballou – recording at GodCity, Magpie and Witch Doctor; mixing at GodCity
Jacob Bannon – mixing at GodCity
Alan Douches – mastering at West West Side
Matthew Ellard – mixing at GodCity
Shawn Moseley – additional engineering
Chris Moylan – additional engineering

Artwork
 Jacob Bannon – artwork

Redux production
Alan Douches – remastering at GodCity
Kurt Ballou – remixing at GodCity

Chart performance

Redux

References

External links
Official promotional website for the album
You Fail Me on Bandcamp

Converge (band) albums
2004 albums
Epitaph Records albums
Deathwish Inc. albums
Albums produced by Kurt Ballou
Albums with cover art by Jacob Bannon